Despot or despotes was a senior Byzantine court title that was bestowed on the sons or sons-in-law of reigning emperors, and initially denoted the heir-apparent of the Byzantine emperor.

From Byzantium it spread throughout the late medieval Balkans and was also granted in the states under Byzantine cultural influence, such as the Latin Empire, the Second Bulgarian Empire, the Serbian Empire and its successor states (Bulgarian and ), and the Empire of Trebizond. With the political fragmentation of the period, the term gave rise to several principalities termed "despotates" which were ruled either as independent states or as appanages by princes bearing the title of despot; most notably the Despotate of Epirus, the Despotate of the Morea, the Despotate of Dobruja and the Serbian Despotate.

In modern usage, the word has taken a different meaning: "despotism" is a form of government in which a single entity rules with absolute power. The semantic shift undergone by the term is mirrored by "tyrant", an ancient Greek word that originally bore no negative connotation, and the Latin "dictator", a constitutionally sanctioned office of the Roman Republic. In colloquial Modern Greek, the word is often used to refer to a bishop.

Origin and history

The original Greek term δεσπότης meant simply 'lord' and was synonymous with κύριος. As the Greek equivalent to the Latin ,  was initially used as a form of address indicating respect. As such it was applied to any person of rank, but in a more specific sense to God (e.g. Revelation 6:10), bishops and the patriarchs, and primarily the Roman and Byzantine Emperors. Occasionally it was used in formal settings, for example on coins (since Leo III the Isaurian) or formal documents. During the 8th and 9th centuries, co-emperors appear on coinage with the address , but this was still a mark of respect rather than an official title. Before the 12th century, the honorific was used interchangeably with the more formal title of basileus.

Although it was used for high-ranking nobles from the early 12th century, the title of despot began being used as a specific court title by Manuel I Komnenos, who conferred it in 1163 to the future King Béla III of Hungary, the Emperor's son-in-law and, until the birth of Alexios II in 1169, heir-presumptive.

From this time and until the end of the Byzantine Empire, the title of despot became the highest Byzantine dignity, which placed its holders "immediately after the emperor" (Rodolphe Guilland). Nevertheless, the Byzantine emperors from the Komnenoi to the Palaiologoi, as well as the Latin Emperors who claimed their succession and imitated their styles, continued to use the term  in its more generic sense of 'lord' in their personal seals and in imperial coinage.

During the last centuries of Byzantium's existence, the title was awarded to the younger sons of emperors (the eldest sons were usually crowned as co-emperors, with the title of ) as well as to the emperor's sons-in-law. The title entailed extensive honours and privileges, including the control of large estates – the domains of Michael VIII's brother John Palaiologos for instance included the islands of Lesbos and Rhodes – to finance their extensive households. Women could not hold a noble title, but bore the titles of their husbands. Thus the spouse of a despot, the despotess, had the right to bear the same insignia as he. Among the women of the court, the despotesses likewise took the first place after the empress.

The use of the title spread also to the other countries of the Balkans. The Latin Empire used it to honour the Doge of Venice Enrico Dandolo and the local ruler of the Rhodope region, Alexius Slav. After ca. 1219 it was regularly borne (it is not clear whether the title was awarded by the Emperor or usurped) by the Venetian podestàs in Constantinople, as the Venetian support became crucial to the Empire's survival. In 1279/80, it was introduced in Bulgaria to placate the powerful magnate (and later Tsar) George Terter in 1279/80. During the Serbian Empire it was widely awarded among the various Serbian magnates, with Jovan Oliver being the first holder, and it was held by lesser principalities as well, including the self-proclaimed Albanian despots of Arta. In the 15th century, the Venetian governors of Corfu were also styled as despots. As the title of despot was conferred by the emperor and usually implied a degree of submission by the awardee, the Palaiologan emperors tried long to persuade the Emperors of Trebizond, who also claimed the Byzantine imperial title, to accept the title of despot instead.

With the death of the last Byzantine Emperor Constantine XI on May 29, 1453, the creation of a despot became irregular. The title was granted by Pope Paul II to Andreas Palaiologos, heir to the Byzantine throne in 1465, and by the king of Hungary to the heirs of the Serbian Despotate.

Despotates
From the mid-14th century on, various territories were given to imperial princes with the rank of despot to rule as semi-autonomous appanages, some of which have become widely known in historiography as "despotates" (sing. The close association of title and territory began already from the late 13th century and became widespread from the mid-14th century, as a steady succession of despots began to rule over the same territory. Nevertheless, the term "despotate" is technically inaccurate: the title of despot, like every other Byzantine dignity, was not hereditary nor intrinsic to a specific territory. Even in the so-called "despotates", a son of a despot might succeed to his father's territory but could not and would not hold the title unless it was conferred anew by the emperor. In normal Byzantine usage, a clear distinction was drawn between the personal dignity of despot and any other offices or attributes of its holder. Thus for instance John II Orsini was described as "the ruler of Acarnania, the despot John" rather than "the despot of Acarnania" by the emperor-historian John VI Kantakouzenos.

Insignia

According to the mid-14th-century Book of Offices of Pseudo-Kodinos and the descriptions given by the historian George Pachymeres, the despot's insignia in the Byzantine court were characterised by the colours purple and white, and a rich decoration in pearls. In detail, the insignia were:

 A brimmed hat called  studded with pearls, with a neck-cover with the owner's name embroidered in gold and pendants "similar to those of the emperor". The  was an everyday headgear, but it was forbidden to despots who had not reached adolescence to wear it indoors. For ceremonies and festivities, the despot bore the domed , decorated with gold metalwork, precious stones and pearls.
 A red tunic similar to the emperor's, with gold embroideries of the  style but without military insignia, red leggings and a red cloak with broad stripes. For festive occasions, the long kaftan-like  was worn, of red or purple colour and decorated with pearls.
 A pair of purple and white soft boots, decorated with imperial eagles made of pearls on the sides and the instep. The spurs were also bi-coloured, purple and white. In a few cases where emperors wished to show special favour to a son (Constantine Palaiologos under Michael VIII Palaiologos and Matthew Kantakouzenos under John VI Kantakouzenos), red boots like the emperor's were substituted, elevating its holder to an ad hoc, quasi-imperial rank "above the despots".
 The despot's saddle and horse furniture were similar to that of the emperor, likewise in purple and white, decorated with pearl eagles. The coating of the saddle and the despot's tent were white with small red eagles.

The despot also had the right to sign his letters with an ink of a dark red colour (the emperor's was bright red).

Lists of known holders

Byzantine Empire
Note: Names in italics indicate persons who claimed the title but were never conferred it by a reigning Byzantine emperor

Despots of the Morea

Despots of Epirus

Latin Empire

Bulgarian Empire

Serbian Empire and successor states

See also

 Despotovac

Notes and references
Notes

References

Sources

 
 
 
 
 
 
 
 
 
 
 
 
 

 
 
 
 
 
 
 
 
 
 
 

Byzantine imperial titles
Byzantine court titles
Serbian noble titles
Noble titles
Bulgarian noble titles
 
Lists of office-holders in the Byzantine Empire
Serbia-related lists